Mama is a 2014 South Korean television series starring Song Yoon-ah, Hong Jong-hyun, Jung Joon-ho, and Moon Jung-hee. It aired on MBC from August 2 to October 19, 2014 on Saturdays and Sundays at 21:45 for 24 episodes.

Plot
Han Seung-hee is a successful painter and a happy single mother to her son, Geu-roo. But when she gets diagnosed with a terminal illness, Seung-hee becomes determined that Geu-roo will be adopted by a nice family after she's gone. So she seeks out her ex-boyfriend Moon Tae-joo, and ends up befriending Tae-joo's wife, Seo Ji-eun. Meanwhile, a much younger photographer Gu Ji-sub falls for Seung-hee.

Cast

Main characters
Song Yoon-ah as Han Seung-hee
Hong Jong-hyun as Gu Ji-sub
Jung Joon-ho as Moon Tae-joo
Moon Jeong-hee as Seo Ji-eun
Yoon Chan-young as Han Geu-roo
Choi Seung-hoon as child Geu-roo
Park Seo-joon as older Geu-roo

Supporting characters
Choi Song-hyun as Na Se-na
Jung Jae-soon as Park Nam-soon
Kim Hyun-kyoon as Moon Tae-hoon
Jo Min-ah as Moon Bo-na
Kim Jung-wook as Seo Young-jin
Park Jung-soo as Kang Myung-ja
Jeon Jin-seo as Seo Hyun-soo
Lee Hee-do as Company president Gu
Son Seong-yoon as Kang Rae-yeon
Jang Seo-won as Assistant manager Lee
Lee Chae-eun as Miss Jung
Jung Soo-young as Jin Hyo-jung
Jeon Soo-kyeong as Kwon Do-hee
Choi Jong-hwan as Director Kim
Park Ha-young as Bong Min-joo
Jeon Jun-hyeok as Kim Han-se
Park Ah-in as Suzy
Hyun Jyu-ni as Rachel

Awards and nominations

International broadcast
It aired in Japan on cable channel KNTV beginning December 10, 2014.

References

External links
 
Mama at MBC Global Media

2014 South Korean television series debuts
2014 South Korean television series endings
MBC TV television dramas
Korean-language television shows
South Korean melodrama television series
South Korean romance television series
Television series by Pan Entertainment